New Jersey's 16th Legislative District is one of 40 in the New Jersey Legislature. As of the 2011 apportionment, the district includes the Hunterdon County municipalities of Delaware Township, Flemington Borough, Raritan Township, Readington Township and Stockton Borough; the consolidated Mercer County municipality of Princeton; the Middlesex County municipality of South Brunswick Township; and the Somerset County municipalities of Branchburg Township, Hillsborough Township, Manville Borough, Millstone Borough, Montgomery Township, Rocky Hill Borough and Somerville Borough.

Demographic characteristics
As of the 2020 United States census, the district had a population of 233,626, of whom 183,325 (78.5%) were of voting age. The racial makeup of the district was 137,853 (59.0%) White, 11,606 (5.0%) African American, 660 (0.3%) Native American, 55,381 (23.7%) Asian, 78 (0.0%) Pacific Islander, 10,118 (4.3%) from some other race, and 17,930 (7.7%) from two or more races. Hispanic or Latino of any race were 25,020 (10.7%) of the population. 

The district had 180,724 registered voters as of December 1, 2021, of whom 68,632 (38.0%) were registered as unaffiliated, 65,999 (36.5%) were registered as Democrats, 44,514 (24.6%) were registered as Republicans, and 1,579 (0.9%) were registered to other parties.

Home ownership was high as was the percentage of college graduates. District residents were comparatively wealthy, with high incomes and property values that have resulted in low municipal and other property taxes. The district has low numbers of African-Americans, the elderly and poor children. Prior to the 2011 apportionment, registered Republicans outnumbered Democrats by a 2 to 1 margin. Throughout most of the district's history, Republicans held a strong grip in winning elections with the district electing only Republican legislators for over 40 years, one of two in the state (the 40th District is the other). However, the 2011 round of redistricting made the district significantly more Democratic. It gained the Democratic strongholds of Princeton and South Brunswick and lost Bridgewater, Mendham Borough and the Somerset Hills, all of which leaned Republican. The district elected its first Democrat, Andrew Zwicker, in 2015.

Political representation
For the 2022–2023 session, the district is represented in the New Jersey Senate by Andrew Zwicker (D, South Brunswick) and in the General Assembly by Roy Freiman (D, Hillsborough Township) and Sadaf Jaffer (D, Montgomery Township).

The legislative district overlaps with New Jersey's 7th and 12th congressional districts.

Apportionment history
When the 40-district legislative map was created in 1973, the 16th District consisted of all of Somerset County (except Franklin Township and Manville and included Readington in Hunterdon County, and Morris County's Chester Borough and Township and Mendham Borough. Following the 1981 redistricting, the district largely remained the same with Rocky Hill and Millstone boroughs being shifted to the 14th District, Readington trading with East Amwell Township to be Hunterdon's lone municipality in the district, and the removal of the Chesters to add Mendham Township in the Morris County portion. Again, most of Somerset County remained a part of the 16th for the 1991 redistricting, but Franklin Township and its neighboring Somerset County boroughs were added to the district while Bound Brook, Warren Township, Green Brook, Wharton, and North Plainfield were shifted elsewhere; the only municipality outside of Somerset included in the District this decade was Mendham Borough. Changes to the district made as part of the New Jersey Legislative redistricting in 2001, based on the results of the 2000 United States Census, added Bound Brook (from the 17th Legislative District) and removed Franklin Township (to the 17th Legislative District).

John Ewing chose not to run for re-election in 1997 after 30 years in the legislature. He was replaced in the Senate by Walter J. Kavanaugh, with Peter J. Biondi elected to Kavanaugh's former seat in the Assembly. Ewing remarked that "Dear Walter [Kavanaugh] has been waiting and waiting to take my place... he keeps threatening to push me in front of a bus". Kip Bateman moved up to the Senate to fill the seat vacated by the retirement of Walter Kavanaugh in the 2007 elections. Peter Biondi won re-election and was joined in the Assembly by Denise Coyle, a member of the Somerset County Board of Chosen Freeholders.

Prior to the 2011 decennial reapportionment, as part of the 2001 apportionment, the district consisted of the Somerset County municipalities of Bedminster Township, Bernards Township, Bernardsville Borough, Bound Brook Borough, Branchburg Township, Bridgewater Township, Far Hills Borough, Hillsborough Township, Manville Borough, Millstone Borough, Montgomery Township, Peapack-Gladstone Borough, Raritan Borough, Rocky Hill Borough, Somerville Borough, and South Bound Brook Borough and the Morris County municipality of Mendham Borough.
Long-time Senator Raymond Bateman (who had previously served from the 8th District and the Somerset County district) ran for Governor of New Jersey in 1977, losing to Brendan Byrne, with John H. Ewing taking Bateman's seat in the Senate and Elliott F. Smith taking Ewing's former seat in the Assembly.

In 2011, Coyle declined to run for re-election as her Bernards Township home was moved out of the district and the seat was won by Jack Ciattarelli, a member of the Somerset County Board of Chosen Freeholders. Peter Biondi died two days after winning re-election, and was replaced by two appointments of the Republican County Committee members of the 16th district: Ciattarelli was appointed for the remainder of the 2010–2012 session and Readington Township committeewoman Donna Simon was appointed for the first part of the 2012–2014 session.

Simon's appointment would only stand until a November 2012 special election; Simon faced Democrat Marie Corfield in the election to complete the remainder of the term. In the November 6 election which coincided with the general elections for President, U.S. Senate, and the House of Representatives, Simon defeated Corfield by just under 1,000 votes out of 91,000 ballots cast. Simon would be re-elected to a full term in 2013 with Ciattarelli but was defeated in 2015 in a close race by Democrat Andrew Zwicker in 2015. Initial counts showed Simon ahead of Zwicker on the night of the election (Ciattarelli was far enough ahead in first place to be ensured victory) but following the counting of provisional ballots, Simon conceded November 16.

Election history

Election results

Senate

General Assembly

References

Hunterdon County, New Jersey
Mercer County, New Jersey
Middlesex County, New Jersey
Somerset County, New Jersey
16